Tatiana Eva-Marie is a Swiss-born vocalist based in Brooklyn who sings 1930s-style swing and gypsy jazz. She moved from Paris to New York City in 2011, and formed the Avalon Jazz Band in 2014 with violinist Adrien Chevalier. Her singing has been compared to the jazz vocalists Cyrille Aimée and Cécile McLorin Salvant. Her band opened for vocalist and pianist Norah Jones. She is the daughter of musicians Louis Crelier and Anca Maria, and she grew up in France and Switzerland.

Eva-Marie was a finalist on the first season of the television show Music Explorer (fr), a musical competition show in France, in 2014.

References

French women jazz singers
French jazz singers
Living people
People from Brooklyn
Singers from Paris
Year of birth missing (living people)